Melodic motion is the quality of movement of a melody, including nearness or farness of successive pitches or notes in a melody. This may be described as conjunct or disjunct, stepwise, skipwise or no movement, respectively. See also contrapuntal motion. In a conjunct melodic motion, the melodic phrase moves in a stepwise fashion; that is the subsequent notes move up or down a semitone or tone, but no greater. In a disjunct melodic motion, the melodic phrase leaps upwards or downwards; this movement is greater than a whole tone. 
In popular Western music, a melodic leap of disjunct motion is often present in the chorus of a song, to distinguish it from the verses and captivate the audience.

Bruno Nettl describes various types of melodic movement or contour (Nettl 1956, 51–53):
Ascending: Upwards melodic movement
Descending: Downwards melodic movement (prevalent in the New World and Australian music)
Undulating: Equal movement in both directions, using approximately the same intervals for ascent and descent (prevalent in Old World culture music)
Pendulum: Extreme undulation that covers a large range and uses large intervals is called pendulum-type melodic movement
Tile, terrace, or cascading: a number of descending phrases in which each phrase begins on a higher pitch than the last ended (prevalent in the North American Plain Indians music)
Arc: The melody rises and falls in roughly equal amounts, the curve ascending gradually to a climax and then dropping off (prevalent among Navaho Indians and North American Indian music)
Rise: may be considered a musical form, a contrasting section of higher pitch, a "musical plateau".

Other examples include:
Double tonic: smaller pendular motion in one direction

These all may be modal frames or parts of modal frames.

See also
Parsons code
Pitch contour
Voice leading

Sources
Nettl, B. (1956). Music in Primitive Culture. United States of America: Harvard University Press.